Antonio D. Tillis is an American academic administrator currently serving as the chancellor of Rutgers University–Camden. He assumed office on July 1, 2021.

Education 
Tillis earned a Bachelor of Science degree in Spanish from Vanderbilt University, a Master of Arts in Spanish literature from Howard University, and a PhD in Latin American literature from the University of Missouri.

Career 
Tillis has contributed articles to several academic publications, including The Afro-Hispanic Reader and Anthology, Callaloo, Hispania, Mosaic: An Interdisciplinary Critical Journal, CA, and Transit Circle. He co-authored The Trayvon Martin in US: An American Tragedy and edited Critical Perspectives on Afro-Latin American Literature. Tillis served as the dean of the School of Languages, Culture & World Affairs at the College of Charleston. He also chair of the Latin American and Latino studies department at Purdue University. He was also the chair of the African and African-American studies department at Dartmouth College. Tillis joined the University of Houston–Downtown as dean of the College of Liberal Arts and Social Sciences. He was selected by trustees of the University of Houston System to serve as interim president on July 2, 2020. On April 27, 2021, Rutgers University President Jonathan Holloway announced that Tillis would assume the post of chancellor of Rutgers University–Camden on July 1, 2021.

Tillis' research focuses on Hispanism, African-American studies, Latino studies, African-American culture, Latin American culture, Afro-Latino culture and literature, and Latin American literature.

References 

Living people
Vanderbilt University alumni
Howard University alumni
University of Missouri alumni
College of Charleston faculty
Purdue University faculty
Dartmouth College faculty
University of Houston–Downtown faculty
Black studies scholars
Latin Americanists
Literary scholars
Scholars of African literature
Year of birth missing (living people)